Samia cynthia, the ailanthus silkmoth, is a saturniid moth, used to produce silk fabric but not as domesticated as the silkworm, Bombyx mori. There are eyespots on the outer forewings. The species was first described by Dru Drury in 1773.

Eri silk

The common name, ailanthus silkmoth, refers to the host plant Ailanthus. There is a subspecies, S. cynthia ricini in India and Thailand that feeds upon the leaves of castor bean, and is known for the production of eri silk, and is often referred to by the common name eri silkmoth.

The eri silk worm is the only completely domesticated silkworm other than Bombyx mori. The silk is extremely durable, but cannot be easily reeled off the cocoon and is thus spun like cotton or wool.

Range
Peigler & Naumann (2003), in their revision of the genus Samia, listed material of true Samia cynthia examined as follows:

Indigenous populations
 Asia: China (Zhejiang, Shanghai, Jiangxi, Jiangsu, Shandong, Beijing, Shanxi, Liaoning, Heilongjiang); Korea (North Pyongan, South Pyongan, Pyongyang, Kangwon, South Kyongsan, Chungcheongnam-do province)

Introduced populations
These include moths that have escaped from cultivation or were introduced and naturalized:
 Asia: Japan; India; Thailand
 Australasia: Australia
 America: Canada; United States; Venezuela; Uruguay; Brazil
 Africa: Tunisia
 Europe: France; Austria; Switzerland; Germany; Spain; Bulgaria; Italy

Life cycle

Eggs
Whitish eggs, marked with brown, are laid in rows of 10 to 20 on leaves in crescents. Hatching takes 7 to 10 days.

Larvae
Larvae are gregarious and yellow at first. Later instars are solitary, and whitish green with white tubercules along the back, and small black dots. There are five instars, and they reach a maximum length .

Pupae

A silken off-white to grey cocoon is spun on the leaves of the host. It has an obvious escape hatch.

Adults
Females prepare to mate in the evening or night after emerging in late morning. Adult flight is during May and June in northern Europe, as one generation. In southern Europe a partial second generation may occur in September. Adults lack mouth parts and can neither eat nor drink.

Food plants
Larvae will feed on other trees and shrubs, but all eggs are laid on the "tree of heaven" (Ailanthus altissima) and growth is best on it. This tree is commonly grown as an ornamental in cities, but is considered a noxious weed and vigorous invasive species and is one of the worst invasive plant species in Europe and North America. The subspecies S. cynthia ricini feeds upon castor bean.

See also
 Sericulture

References

Further reading
Tuskes, PM, JP Tuttle and MM Collins. 1996. The Wild Silk Moths of North America. Cornell University Press. 
Saturnids of Western Palearctic

External links

Cynthia moth (Samia cynthia) mating (YouTube video).
Cynthia moth (Samia cynthia) laying eggs (YouTube video).
Lepiforum e. V.

Saturniinae
Moths of Japan
Moths of Europe
Moths of North America
Moths of New Zealand
Moths described in 1773
Taxa named by Dru Drury
Sericulture